Zak Knutson (born January 4, 1974 in Detroit, Michigan) is a director, producer, writer, and actor.

Career

1990s
Starting in 1993, Knutson acted in multiple television programs including The Fresh Prince of Bel-Air, Coach, Beverly Hills, 90210, and The John Larroquette Show.

2000s
In 2000, Knutson landed an assistant role at View Askew Productions.
In 2005, he created the production company Chop Shop Entertainment with longtime friend Joey Figueroa.

2010s
The last Chop Shop project was Milius, a documentary on Hollywood rebel John Milius. The film opened at the SXSW Film Festival in 2013. The film also played at the Telluride Film Festival and the BFI London Film Festival. 
In 2014, Knutson directed Marvel 75: From Pulp to Pop for Marvel and ABC Television.
Knutson directed Shock the World, a documentary about Jesse Ventura's path from professional wrestler to governor of Minnesota. Shock the World premiered April 2015 at the Tribeca/ESPN Sports Film Festival.

Knutson directed Marvel's Captain America: 75 Heroic Years, which aired on ABC on January 19, 2016.

The film Supercon, starring Clancy Brown, Maggie Grace and John Malkovich, was written by Knutson (along with Dana Snyder and Andy Sipes) and is directed by Knutson.

Personal life
In his youth, Knutson was an avid surfer and a fan of the film Big Wednesday. Knutson worked as a bouncer in the mid 1990s and as a tour guide for Universal Studios Hollywood.

Filmography

Awards and nominations

References

External links
 

Film producers from Michigan
Male actors from Detroit
1974 births
Living people
American film directors
Comedy film directors